L.A. Confidential is a 1997 American neo-noir crime film directed, produced, and co-written by Curtis Hanson. The screenplay by Hanson and Brian Helgeland is based on James Ellroy's 1990 novel of the same name, the third book in his L.A. Quartet series. The film tells the story of a group of LAPD officers in 1953, and the intersection of police corruption and Hollywood celebrity. The title refers to the 1950s scandal magazine Confidential, portrayed in the film as Hush-Hush.

At the time, Australian actors Guy Pearce and Russell Crowe were relatively unknown in North America. One of the film's backers, Peter Dennett, was worried about the lack of established stars in the lead roles, but supported Hanson's casting decisions, and the director had the confidence also to recruit Kevin Spacey, Kim Basinger, and Danny DeVito.

L.A. Confidential was a critical and commercial success. It grossed $126 million against a $35 million budget and received acclaim from critics, with praise for the acting, writing, directing, editing, and Jerry Goldsmith's musical score. It was nominated for nine Academy Awards, including Best Picture, winning two: Best Supporting Actress (Basinger) and Best Adapted Screenplay; Titanic won in every other category L.A. Confidential was nominated for. In 2015, the Library of Congress selected L.A. Confidential for preservation in the United States National Film Registry as "culturally, historically, or aesthetically significant".

Plot
In 1953 Los Angeles, LAPD Sergeant Edmund Exley is determined to live up to the reputation of his father, famed detective Preston Exley, who was killed by an unknown assailant whom Exley secretly nicknamed "Rollo Tomasi", his prototype of "the guy who gets away with it."  He volunteers to testify against corrupt police officers involved in the "Bloody Christmas" case in exchange for promotion to Detective Lieutenant, against the advice of precinct captain Dudley Smith.

Plainclothes Officer Wendell "Bud" White is obsessed with punishing men who abuse women, his own mother having been beaten to death by his father. White hates Exley because his partner, Dick Stensland, was fired thanks to Exley's testimony. With gangster Mickey Cohen imprisoned for tax evasion, Smith recruits White to torture and frighten away out-of-town criminals trying to gain a foothold in Los Angeles. While at a liquor store, White also encounters Lynn Bracken, a prostitute resembling Veronica Lake, and former cop Leland "Buzz" Meeks. Both work for Pierce Patchett, whose Fleur-de-Lis service runs high-end prostitutes altered by plastic surgery to resemble film stars.

Sergeant Jack Vincennes is a narcotics detective who moonlights as a technical advisor on Badge of Honor, a TV police drama series. Sid Hudgens, publisher of the Hush-Hush tabloid magazine, tips Vincennes on celebrity criminal activity so that he can make high-profile arrests for Sid's publication.

Exley soon investigates a robbery and multiple homicide at the Nite Owl coffee shop. Stensland was one of the victims. Exley and Vincennes arrest three African-American felons for the crime; they later escape from police custody and are killed by Exley in a shootout. Exley is decorated for bravery. Although the Nite Owl case appears solved, Exley and White investigate further, discovering evidence of corruption all around them. White begins a relationship with Lynn, and recognizes Nite Owl victim Susan Lefferts as one of Patchett's escorts. Lefferts' mother tells White that Stensland was Susan's "boyfriend"; White searches the crawl space under the mother's house and finds Meeks' corpse. He then interrogates Johnny Stompanato, Cohen's ex-bodyguard, who says Meeks was trying to sell a large stash of heroin he had stolen.

Hudgens involves Vincennes in setting up a homosexual tryst between struggling actor Matt Reynolds and District Attorney Ellis Loew, intending to create a lucrative scandal. After Reynolds is found murdered, a guilt-ridden Vincennes joins Exley's investigation to find the killer. Vincennes later confronts Smith with evidence that Meeks and Stensland worked together under Smith's command a decade earlier, and dropped an investigation on Patchett, who had Hudgens photographing businessmen with prostitutes in a blackmail scam. Smith shoots Vincennes, who dies after murmuring "Rollo Tomasi".

The next day, Exley's suspicions are aroused when Smith asks him who "Rollo Tomasi" is. While interrogating Hudgens, Smith arranges for White to see photos of Lynn having sex with Exley, which sends an enraged White to find him. At the police station, White and Exley fight, but stop when both realize that Smith is corrupt. They deduce that Stensland killed Meeks over the stolen heroin, and that the Nite Owl killings were to allow Smith to kill Stensland. Smith's men framed the three African-Americans for the Nite Owl murders with planted evidence. Exley and White interrogate Loew and learn that Smith and Patchett (aided by Hudgens' blackmail photos) have been taking over Cohen's criminal empire, and that the killings were because of Smith tying up loose ends. They later find Patchett and Hudgens murdered.

Smith lures Exley and White into an ambush. After the pair kill Smith's hitmen in a gunfight, White and Smith wound each other. As Exley holds Smith at gunpoint, Smith assures him that he can "explain" everything to the arriving police and Exley will be promoted. Smith walks away toward the newly gathered squad cars, but Exley shoots him in the back, killing him.

At the police station, Exley explains what he, Vincennes and White learned about Smith's corruption. The LAPD decides to protect their image by saying Smith died a hero in the shootout, while awarding Exley a second medal for bravery. Outside city hall, Exley says goodbye to Lynn and White before watching them drive off to Lynn's home in Arizona.

Cast
 Kevin Spacey as Detective Sergeant Jack "Hollywood Jack" Vincennes
 Russell Crowe as Detective Sergeant Wendell "Bud" White
 Guy Pearce as Detective Lieutenant Edmund "Shotgun Ed" Exley
 James Cromwell as Captain Dudley Smith
 Kim Basinger as Lynn Bracken
 Danny DeVito as Sid Hudgens
 David Strathairn as Pierce Morehouse Patchett
 Ron Rifkin as District Attorney Ellis Loew
 Graham Beckel as Detective Sergeant Richard "Dick Stens" Stensland
 Amber Smith as Susan Lefferts
 John Mahon as Police Chief
 Paul Guilfoyle as Meyer "Mickey" Cohen
 Matt McCoy as Brett Chase
 Paolo Seganti as Johnny Stompanato
 Simon Baker Denny as Matt Reynolds
 Tomas Arana as Detective Sergeant Michael Breuning
 Michael McCleery as Detective Sergeant William Carlisle
 Shawnee Free Jones as Tammy Jordan
 Darrell Sandeen as Leland "Buzz" Meeks
 Marisol Padilla Sánchez as Inez Soto
 Gwenda Deacon as Mrs. Lefferts
 Jim Metzler as Councilman
 Brenda Bakke as Lana Turner

Production

Development
Curtis Hanson had read half a dozen of James Ellroy's books before L.A. Confidential and was drawn to its characters, not the plot. He said, "What hooked me on them was that, as I met them, one after the other, I didn't like them—but as I continued reading, I started to care about them." Ellroy's novel also made Hanson think about Los Angeles and provided him with an opportunity to "set a movie at a point in time when the whole dream of Los Angeles, from that apparently golden era of the '20s and '30s, was being bulldozed."

Screenwriter Brian Helgeland was originally signed to Warner Bros. to write a Viking film with director Uli Edel and then worked on an unproduced modern-day King Arthur story. Helgeland was a longtime fan of Ellroy's novels. When he heard that Warner Bros. had acquired the rights to L.A. Confidential in 1990, he lobbied to script the film, but the studio was then talking only to well-known screenwriters. When he finally got a meeting, it was canceled two days before it was to occur.

Helgeland found that Hanson had been hired to direct and met with him while the filmmaker was making The River Wild. They found that they not only shared a love for Ellroy's fiction but also agreed on how to adapt Confidential into a film. According to Helgeland, they had to "remove every scene from the book that didn't have the three main cops in it, and then to work from those scenes out." According to Hanson, he "wanted the audience to be challenged but at the same time I didn't want them to get lost." They worked on the script together for two years, with Hanson turning down jobs and Helgeland writing seven drafts for free.

The two men also got Ellroy's approval. He had seen Hanson's films The Bedroom Window and Bad Influence, and found him "a competent and interesting storyteller", but was not convinced that his book would be made into a film until he talked to the eventual director. He later said, "They preserved the basic integrity of the book and its main theme. Brian and Curtis took a work of fiction that had eight plotlines, reduced those to three, and retained the dramatic force of three men working out their destiny."

Warner executive Bill Gerber showed the script to Michael Nathanson, CEO of New Regency Productions, which had a deal with the studio. Nathanson loved it, but they had to get the approval of New Regency's owner, Arnon Milchan. Hanson prepared a presentation that consisted of 15 vintage postcards and pictures of L.A. mounted on posterboards, and made his pitch to Milchan. The pictures consisted of orange groves, beaches, tract homes in the San Fernando Valley, and the opening of the Hollywood Freeway to symbolize the image of prosperity sold to the public.

In the pitch, Hanson showed the darker side of Ellroy's novel by presenting the cover of scandal rag Confidential and the famous shot of Robert Mitchum coming out of jail after his marijuana bust. He also had photographs of jazz musicians Zoot Sims, Gerry Mulligan, and Chet Baker to represent the popular music of the time. Hanson emphasized that the period detail would be in the background and the characters in the foreground. Milchan was impressed with his presentation and agreed to finance it.

Casting
Hanson had seen Russell Crowe in Romper Stomper and found him "repulsive and scary, but captivating". The actor had read Ellroy's The Black Dahlia but not L.A. Confidential. When he read the script, Crowe was drawn to Bud White's "self-righteous moral crusade". Crowe fit the visual preconception of Bud. Hanson put the actor on tape doing a few scenes from the script and showed it to the film's producers, who agreed to cast him as Bud.

Guy Pearce auditioned, and Hanson felt that he "was very much what I had in mind for Ed Exley." The director purposely did not watch the actor in The Adventures of Priscilla, Queen of the Desert, afraid that it might influence his decision. As he did with Crowe, Hanson taped Pearce and showed it to the producers, who agreed he should be cast as Ed. Pearce did not like Ed when he first read the screenplay and remarked, "I was pretty quick to judge him and dislike him for being so self-righteous ... But I liked how honest he became about himself. I knew I could grow to respect and understand him."

Milchan was against casting "two Australians" in the American period piece (Pearce wryly noted in a later interview that while he and Crowe grew up in Australia, he was born in England to a New Zealand father, while the Māori Crowe is a New Zealander too). Crowe and Pearce were also relative unknowns in North America, and Milchan was equally worried about the lack of film stars in the lead roles. But he supported Hanson's casting decisions and this gave the director the confidence to approach Kim Basinger, Danny DeVito and Kevin Spacey. Hanson cast Crowe and Pearce because he wanted to "replicate my experience of the book. You don't like any of these characters at first, but the deeper you get into their story, the more you begin to sympathize with them. I didn't want actors audiences knew and already liked."

A third Australian actor unknown to American audiences at the time, Simon Baker, later to star in the TV series The Mentalist, was cast in the smaller but noteworthy role of Matt Reynolds, a doomed young bisexual actor. He was billed as Simon Baker Denny in the film's credits.

Hanson felt that the character of Jack Vincennes was "a movie star among cops", and thought of Spacey, with his "movie-star charisma," casting him specifically against type. The director was confident that the actor "could play the man behind that veneer, the man who also lost his soul," and when he gave him the script, he told him to think of Dean Martin while in the role. Hanson cast Basinger because he felt that she "was the character to me. What beauty today could project the glamor of Hollywood's golden age?"

Pre-production
To give his cast and crew points and counterpoints to capture Los Angeles in the 1950s, Hanson held a "mini-film festival", showing one film a week: The Bad and the Beautiful, because it epitomized the glamorous Hollywood look; In a Lonely Place, because it revealed the ugly underbelly of Hollywood glamor; Don Siegel's The Lineup and Private Hell 36, "for their lean and efficient style"; and Kiss Me Deadly, because it was "so rooted in the futuristic '50s: the atomic age." Hanson and the film's cinematographer Dante Spinotti studied Robert Frank's 1958 photographic book The Americans and felt that the influence of his work was in every aspect of the film's visuals. Spinotti wanted to compose the shots of the film as if he was using a still camera and suggested Hanson shoot the film in the Super 35 widescreen format with spherical lenses, which in Spinotti's opinion conveyed the feel of a still photo.

Before filming took place, Hanson brought Crowe and Pearce to Los Angeles for two months to immerse them in the city and the time period. He also got them dialect coaches, showed them vintage police training films, and introduced them to real-life cops. Pearce found the contemporary police force had changed too much to be useful for research and disliked the police officer he rode along with because Pearce felt he was racist. He found the police films more valuable because "there was a real sort of stiffness, a woodenness about these people" that he felt Exley had as well. For six weeks, Crowe, Pearce, Hanson and Helgeland conducted rehearsals, which consisted of their discussing each scene in the script. As other actors were cast they would join in the rehearsals.

Principal photography

Hanson did not want the film to be an exercise in nostalgia, and so had Spinotti shoot it like a contemporary film, and used more naturalistic lighting than in a classic film noir. He told Spinotti and the film's production designer Jeannine Oppewall to pay great attention to period detail, but to then "put it all in the background". L.A. Confidential was shot at the Linda Vista Community Hospital in the Los Angeles area. Several famous Hollywood landmarks appropriate to the 1950s were used, including the Formosa Cafe in West Hollywood, the Frolic Room on Hollywood Boulevard, and the Crossroads of the World, an outdoor shopping mall dressed as a movie theatre where the premiere of When Worlds Collide takes place at the beginning of the film.

Patchett's home is the Lovell House, a famous International Style mansion designed by Richard Neutra. Bracken's house is at 501 Wilcox Avenue in the affluent Hancock Park neighborhood, overlooking the Wilshire Country Club. The house required a $75,000 renovation to transform it into the Spanish-style home described in the script. Historic Central Los Angeles neighborhoods were used for the scenes in which the police hunt down the Nite Owl suspects, including Angelino Heights, Lincoln Heights, and Koreatown. The Victory Motel was one of the only purpose-built sets, constructed on a flat stretch of the Inglewood Oil Field in Culver City.

Music

Jerry Goldsmith's score for the film was nominated for the Academy Award for Best Original Dramatic Score, but lost to James Horner's score for Titanic.

Reception
The film was screened at the 1997 Cannes Film Festival. According to Hanson, Warner did not want it shown at Cannes because they felt there was an "anti-studio bias ... So why go and come home a loser?" But Hanson wanted to debut the film at a high-profile international venue. He and other producers bypassed the studio and sent a print directly to the festival's selection committee, which loved it. Ellroy saw the film and said, "I understood in 40 minutes or so that it is a work of art on its own level. It was amazing to see the physical incarnation of the characters."

Box office
L.A. Confidential grossed $64.6 million in the United States, and $61.6 million in other territories, for a worldwide total of $126.2 million.

The film was released on September 19, 1997, in 769 theaters, grossing $5.2 million in its opening weekend and finishing fourth. It made $4.4 million in its second weekend then expanded to 1,625 theaters and grossed $4.7 million in its third.

Critical response
On review aggregator website Rotten Tomatoes, L.A. Confidential holds an approval rating of 99% and an average rating of 9/10, with 162 out of 163 reviews being positive. The site's critical consensus reads: "Taut pacing, brilliantly dense writing and Oscar-worthy acting combine to produce a smart, popcorn-friendly thrill ride." On Metacritic the film has a weighted average score of 90 out of 100, based on 28 critics, indicating "universal acclaim". Audiences polled by CinemaScore gave the film an average grade of "A−" on an A+ to F scale.

Film critic Roger Ebert gave the film four out of four stars and described it as "seductive and beautiful, cynical and twisted, and one of the best films of the year." He later included it as one of his "Great Movies" and described it as "film noir, and so it is, but it is more: Unusually for a crime film, it deals with the psychology of the characters ... It contains all the elements of police action, but in a sharply clipped, more economical style; the action exists not for itself but to provide an arena for the personalities".

In her review for The New York Times, Janet Maslin wrote, "Mr. Spacey is at his insinuating best, languid and debonair, in a much more offbeat performance than this film could have drawn from a more conventional star. And the two Australian actors, tightly wound Mr. Pearce and fiery, brawny Mr. Crowe, qualify as revelations." Desson Howe's review for The Washington Post praised the cast: "Pearce makes a wonderful prude who gets progressively tougher and more jaded. New Zealand-born Crowe has a unique and sexy toughness; imagine Mickey Rourke without the attitude. Although she's playing a stock character, Basinger exudes a sort of chaste sultriness. Spacey is always enjoyable."

In his review for The Globe and Mail, Liam Lacey wrote, "The big star is Los Angeles itself. Like Roman Polanski's depiction of Los Angeles in the '30s in Chinatown, the atmosphere and detailed production design are a rich gel where the strands of narrative form." USA Today gave the film three and a half stars out of four, writing, "It appears as if screenwriters Brian Helgeland and Curtis Hanson have pulled off a miracle in keeping multiple stories straight. Have they ever. Ellroy's novel has four extra layers of plot and three times as many characters ... the writers have trimmed unwieldy muscle, not just fat, and gotten away with it."

In his review for Newsweek, David Ansen wrote, "L.A. Confidential asks the audience to raise its level a bit, too—you actually have to pay attention to follow the double-crossing intricacies of the plot. The reward for your work is dark and dirty fun." Richard Schickel, in his review for Time, wrote, "It's a movie of shadows and half lights, the best approximation of the old black-and-white noir look anyone has yet managed on color stock. But it's no idle exercise in style. The film's look suggests how deep the tradition of police corruption runs." Writing in Time Out New York, Andrew Johnston observed: "Large chunks of Ellroy's brilliant (and often hilarious) dialogue are preserved, and the actors clearly relish the meaty lines. Dante Spinotti's lush cinematography and Jeanne Oppewall's crisp, meticulous production design produce an eye-popping tableau of '50s glamour and sleaze."

In his review for The New York Observer, Andrew Sarris wrote, "Mr. Crowe strikes the deepest registers with the tortured character of Bud White, a part that has had less cut out of it from the book than either Mr. Spacey's or Mr. Pearce's ... but Mr. Crowe at moments reminded me of James Cagney's poignant performance in Charles Vidor's Love Me or Leave Me (1955), and I can think of no higher praise." Kenneth Turan, in his review for Los Angeles Times, wrote, "The only potential audience drawback L.A. Confidential has is its reliance on unsettling bursts of violence, both bloody shootings and intense physical beatings that give the picture a palpable air of menace. Overriding that, finally, is the film's complete command of its material." In his review for The Independent, Ryan Gilbey wrote, "In fact, it's a very well made and intelligent picture, assembled with an attention to detail, both in plot and characterisation, that you might have feared was all but extinct in mainstream American cinema." Richard Williams, in his review for The Guardian, wrote, "L.A. Confidential gets just about everything right. The light, the architecture, the slang, the music ... a wonderful Lana Turner joke. A sense, above all, of damaged people arriving to make new lives and getting seduced by the scent of night-blooming jasmine, the perfume of corruption."

Some authors have described L.A. Confidential as a neo-noir film.

Accolades
TIME magazine ranked L.A. Confidential the best film of 1997. The National Society of Film Critics also ranked it the year's best film and Curtis Hanson was voted Best Director. The New York Film Critics Circle also voted L.A. Confidential the year's best film in addition to ranking Hanson best director, and his and Brian Helgeland's best screenplay. The Los Angeles Film Critics Association and the National Board of Review also voted L.A. Confidential the year's best film. As a result, it is one of three films in history to sweep the "Big Four" critics' awards, alongside Schindler's List (1993) and The Social Network (2010).

It was also voted the best film set in Los Angeles in the last 25 years by a group of Los Angeles Times writers and editors with two criteria: "The movie had to communicate some inherent truth about the L.A. experience, and only one film per director was allowed on the list." In 2009, the London Film Critics' Circle voted L.A. Confidential one of the best films of the past 30 years.

Home media
A DVD was released on April 21, 1998. In addition to the film, it included two featurettes, an interactive map of Los Angeles, a music-only track, a theatrical trailer, and three TV spots.

The movie was released again as a two-disc Special Edition DVD and Blu-ray on September 23, 2008. Both sets have the same bonus content. In addition to the features from the original DVD, there are four new featurettes, the 1999 pilot of the proposed TV series starring Kiefer Sutherland, and film commentary by writer (novel) James Ellroy, writer (screenplay)/co-producer Brian Helgeland, actors Kevin Spacey, Russell Crowe, Guy Pearce, James Cromwell, Kim Basinger, Danny DeVito & David Strathairn, production designer Jeannine Oppewall, director of photography Dante Spinotti, costume designer Ruth Myers and American film critic Andrew Sarris. Some sets included a six-song sampler from the film's soundtrack.

On September 26, 2017, 20th Century Fox Home Entertainment, the distributor and part owner of New Regency, rereleased the film on Blu-ray as part of its 20th anniversary with new cover artwork. The disc has the same technical specifications and bonus features as the previous Blu-ray.

Sequel
In October 2020, Brian Helgeland confirmed a sequel to L.A. Confidential had been in development before the death of Chadwick Boseman, who would have played a young cop named James Muncie. Crowe and Pearce would have reprised their roles, and the film was to have been set in 1974.

Notes

References

Further reading

External links

 
 
 
 
 
 

1997 films
1997 crime drama films
1997 crime thriller films
1990s thriller drama films
American crime drama films
American crime thriller films
American thriller drama films
BAFTA winners (films)
Edgar Award-winning works
Fictional portrayals of the Los Angeles Police Department
Films scored by Jerry Goldsmith
Films about Jewish-American organized crime
Films about murderers
Films about police corruption
Films about police brutality
Films about prostitution in the United States
Films based on American crime novels
Films based on works by James Ellroy
Films with screenplays by Brian Helgeland
Films directed by Curtis Hanson
Films featuring a Best Supporting Actress Academy Award-winning performance
Films featuring a Best Supporting Actress Golden Globe-winning performance
Films set in 1951
Films set in 1952
Films set in 1953
Films set in Los Angeles
Films whose writer won the Best Adapted Screenplay Academy Award
Mafia films
American neo-noir films
American police detective films
Films about police misconduct
Regency Enterprises films
United States National Film Registry films
The Wolper Organization films
Warner Bros. films
1990s police procedural films
National Society of Film Critics Award for Best Film winners
Films produced by Arnon Milchan
1990s English-language films
1990s American films